Tiaan Thomas-Wheeler (born 19 November 1999) is a Welsh rugby union player who plays for Ospreys regional team as a centre.

Thomas-Wheeler made his debut for the Ospreys regional team in 2018 against Zebre having previously played for the Ospreys academy and Neath RFC. In the 2019 World Rugby Under 20 Championship he scored the vital try in Wales's win over New Zealand

References

External links 
Ospreys Player Profile

1999 births
Living people
Ospreys (rugby union) players
Rugby union centres
Rugby union players from Neath
Welsh rugby union players